Zimbabwe House may refer to:

Embassy of Zimbabwe, London, the embassy of Zimbabwe in London which is located in Zimbabwe House
Zimbabwe House, Harare, a  government and former Prime Ministerial residence building in Harare, Zimbabwe